The discography of Jadakiss, an American rapper, consists of six studio albums, one collaborative album, six mixtapes and  12 singles.

Albums

Studio albums

Mixtapes

Singles

As lead artist

As featured artist

Other charted and certified songs

Guest appearances

Music videos

See also 
 The LOX discography

References 

Discographies of American artists
Hip hop discographies